The 2017–18 Atlantic Coast Conference men's basketball season began with practices in October 2017, followed by the start of the 2017–18 NCAA Division I men's basketball season in November. Conference play started in late December 2017 and concluded in March with the 2018 ACC men's basketball tournament at the Barclays Center in Brooklyn, New York. The Virginia Cavaliers won an outright regular season championship, their third in five years under the guidance of Tony Bennett, who also received his third ACC Coach of the Year Award. He also became the only living three-time winner of the Henry Iba Award for national coach of the year.

The Cavaliers finished 17–1 in the conference, finishing four games above second-place Duke. Virginia went on to win the tournament by handily defeating Louisville 75–58, Clemson 64–58, and North Carolina 71–63 in the championship game. Sophomore guard Kyle Guy was named Tournament MVP as well as First-Team All-ACC. Both the Virginia–North Carolina title game and Duke–North Carolina semifinal game set the Barclays Center attendance record for college basketball games, and conference leadership vowed to return the ACC tournament to New York again in the near future.

Head coaches

Coaching changes 
On February 16, 2017, NC State head coach Mark Gottfried was fired, but the school allowed him to finish out the season. He finished at NC State with a six-year record of 123–86. On March 17, the school hired UNC Wilmington head coach Kevin Keatts as head coach.

On September 26, 2017, federal prosecutors in New York announced that Louisville was under investigation for an alleged "pay for play" scheme involving recruits. The allegations state that an Adidas executive conspired to pay $100,000 to the family of a top-ranked national recruit to play at Louisville and to represent Adidas when he turned pro. The criminal complaint does not name Louisville specifically but appears to involve the recruitment of Brian Bowen, a late, surprise commit to the school. On September 27, head coach Rick Pitino and athletic director Tom Jurich were placed on administrative leave.

Coaches 

Notes:
 Year at school includes 2017–18 season.
 Overall and ACC records are from time at current school and are through the end the 2016–17 season.
 NCAA tournament appearances are from time at current school only.
 NCAA Final Fours and Championship include time at other schools

Preseason

Preseason watchlists
Below is a table of notable preseason watch lists.

Preseason polls

ACC Preseason Media Poll
In the end of October, 2017 members of the media gathered in Charlotte to vote on the preseason ACC awards.  Conference finish, Preseason ACC teams, rookie of the year, and player of the year were all voted on.  The results can be seen in the sections below.

Preseason poll
First place votes shown in parenthesis.
  
 Duke (57) – 1020
 North Carolina (7) – 921
 Notre Dame (4) – 852
 Miami (1) – 809
 Louisville – 733
 Virginia – 690
 Virginia Tech – 549
 Florida State – 519
 Georgia Tech – 468
 Syracuse – 420
 Wake Forest – 378
 NC State – 310
 Clemson – 289
 Boston College – 181
 Pittsburgh – 141

Preseason All-ACC teams

ACC Preseason Player of the year
Bonzie Colson, Notre Dame (49)
Grayson Allen, Duke (9)
Joel Berry II, North Carolina (9)
Bruce Brown Jr., Miami (1)
Jerome Robinson, Boston College (1)

ACC Preseason Rookie of the year
Marvin Bagley III, Duke (58)
Lonnie Walker, Miami (3)
Lavar Batts Jr., NC State (2)
M. J. Walker, Florida State (2)
Jalek Felton, North Carolina (1)
Aamir Simms, Clemson (1)
Oshae Brissett, Syracuse (1)
De’Andre Hunter, Virginia (1)

Regular season

Rankings

 Notes: The week 2 Coaches Poll did not release at the same time as the week 2 AP poll.  The AP poll does not release a final poll after the NCAA tournament, where as the Coaches Poll does.

Conference matrix
This table summarizes the head-to-head results between teams in conference play. Each team will play 18 conference games, and at least 1 against each opponent.

Player of the week
Throughout the conference regular season, the Atlantic Coast Conference offices named one or two Players of the week and one or two Rookies of the week.

Records against other conferences
2017–18 records against non-conference foes as of (Feb. 3, 2018).  Records shown for regular season only.

Postseason

ACC tournament

  2018 Atlantic Coast Conference Basketball Tournament, Barclays Center, Brooklyn.

* Denotes Overtime Game

AP Rankings at time of tournament

NCAA tournament

National Invitation tournament

Honors and awards

All-Americans

To earn "consensus" status, a player must win honors based on a point system computed from the four different all-America teams. The point system consists of three points for first team, two points for second team and one point for third team. No honorable mention or fourth team or lower are used in the computation. The top five totals plus ties are first team and the next five plus ties are second team.

ACC Awards

2018 NBA draft

The Atlantic Coast Conference had a total of 10 players selected in the 2018 NBA Draft.  Six players were selected in the first round, and 4 players were selected in the second round.  The 10 selections was the most selections of any conference in the draft.  The ACC is the only conference to have had at least four first round picks in each of the last 10 NBA Drafts, and has had at least one first round pick for 30 consecutive years.

Attendance

References